Schnieders is a German occupational surname for a tailor. Notable people with this name include:
Andreas Schnieders (1966–2022), German boxer
Richard J. Schnieders, American chief operating officer

References

German-language surnames
Occupational surnames